A Collateral Billing number (CBN) is a number that sometimes can be given in place of a purchase order or a credit card number to ensure a products return. For example, you receive a defective product and call the manufacturer, they in turn send you a replacement unit after collecting a purchase order, credit card or collateral billing number from you to charge the cost of the unit to in the event that you do not return the original unit.

Procurement